The name Merbok has been used to name four tropical cyclones in the northwestern Pacific Ocean. The name was contributed by Malaysia and means a spotted-neck dove.
 Tropical Storm Merbok (2004) (T0426, Violeta) – brought heavy flooding during mid-November 2004.
 Tropical Storm Merbok (2011) (T1110, 12W)
 Tropical Storm Merbok (2017) (T1702, 04W) – made landfall in China.
 Typhoon Merbok (2022) (T2213, 15W) 

Pacific typhoon set index articles